The 1998 Jiffy Lube 300 was the 17th stock car race of the 1998 NASCAR Winston Cup Series season and the 10th iteration of the event. The race was held on Sunday, July 12, 1998, in Loudon, New Hampshire, at New Hampshire International Speedway, a  permanent, oval-shaped, low-banked racetrack. The race took the scheduled 300 laps to complete. At race's end, Roush Racing driver Jeff Burton would come to dominate most of the race to take his fourth career NASCAR Winston Cup Series victory and his first victory of the season. To fill out the podium, Roush Racing driver Mark Martin and Hendrick Motorsports driver Jeff Gordon would finish second and third, respectively.

Background 

New Hampshire International Speedway is a 1.058-mile (1.703 km) oval speedway located in Loudon, New Hampshire which has hosted NASCAR racing annually since the early 1990s, as well as an IndyCar weekend and the oldest motorcycle race in North America, the Loudon Classic. Nicknamed "The Magic Mile", the speedway is often converted into a 1.6-mile (2.6 km) road course, which includes much of the oval. The track was originally the site of Bryar Motorsports Park before being purchased and redeveloped by Bob Bahre. The track is currently one of eight major NASCAR tracks owned and operated by Speedway Motorsports.

Entry list 

 (R) denotes rookie driver.

Practice

First practice 
The first practice session was held on the morning of Friday, July 10.

Second practice 
The second practice session was held on the afternoon of Friday, July 10.

Final practice 
The final practice session, sometimes referred to as Happy Hour, was held on Saturday, July 11.

Qualifying 
Qualifying was split into two rounds. The first round was held on Friday, July 10, at 3:00 PM EST. Each driver would have one lap to set a time. During the first round, the top 25 drivers in the round would be guaranteed a starting spot in the race. If a driver was not able to guarantee a spot in the first round, they had the option to scrub their time from the first round and try and run a faster lap time in a second round qualifying run, held on Saturday, July 11, at 10:00 AM EST. As with the first round, each driver would have one lap to set a time. On January 24, 1998, NASCAR would announce that the amount of provisionals given would be increased from last season. Positions 26-36 would be decided on time, while positions 37-43 would be based on provisionals. Six spots are awarded by the use of provisionals based on owner's points. The seventh is awarded to a past champion who has not otherwise qualified for the race. If no past champion needs the provisional, the next team in the owner points will be awarded a provisional.

Dave Marcis was the only driver to fail to qualify.

Full qualifying results 

*Time not available.

Race results

References 

1998 NASCAR Winston Cup Series
NASCAR races at New Hampshire Motor Speedway
July 1998 sports events in the United States
1998 in sports in New Hampshire